Allerton  is a surname. Notable people with the name include:

 Elanor Allerton (born 1639), American colonist
 Isaac Allerton, pilgrim on the Mayflower
 Isaac Allerton Jr., son of Isaac Allerton
 Jeremy Allerton (born 1944), English cricketer
 John Allerton, pilgrim on the Mayflower
 Mary Allerton (c. 1616–1699), pilgrim on the Mayflower
 Mary Allerton (1897-1985), pen name of Christine N. Govan
 Robert Allerton (1873–1964), American philanthropist

See also
 Allerton (disambiguation)

surnames